Pantelis Nikolaidis (born 28 February 1942) is a Greek athlete. He competed in the men's pole vault at the 1968 Summer Olympics.

References

1942 births
Living people
Athletes (track and field) at the 1968 Summer Olympics
Greek male pole vaulters
Olympic athletes of Greece
Place of birth missing (living people)
20th-century Greek people